2-Nitrofluorene is a by-product of combustion and is a nitrated polycyclic aromatic hydrocarbon (fluorene). 2-Nitrofluorene is listed as an IARC Group 2B carcinogen, indicating it is possibly carcinogenic to humans.

References 

Nitro compounds
Fluorenes
IARC Group 2B carcinogens